Song Mi-jin (born March 23, 1983), known as Emily Song is a South Korean singer and actress. She is a member of Taiwanese girl group Dream Girls.

Discography

Dream Girls

Filmography

Television series

Films

References

External links

 

1979 births
Living people
South Korean women pop singers
South Korean television actresses
Korean Mandopop singers
21st-century South Korean singers
21st-century South Korean women singers
South Korean expatriates in Taiwan
Singers from Seoul